Batuka may refer to:

Music
"Batuka", by American rock band Santana from Santana (1971 album)
"Batuka", Zumba type workout by Kike Santander
"Batuka", song by Madonna from Madame X (album)
 Batuque (music and dance), credited by Madonna in her 2019 "Batuka" song

See also
Batuka Bhairava group of gods who are worshipped before the commencement of the worship of Lord Shiva.